Newport Jazz Festival All Stars is a live album by an all star group assembled by pianist/promoter George Wein that featured trumpeter Buck Clayton, saxophonist Bud Freeman, trombonist Vic Dickenson and clarinetist Pee Wee Russell which was recorded in Boston in 1959 in preparation for the Newport Jazz Festival and released on the Atlantic label in 1960.

Track listing
 "Royal Garden Blues" (Clarence Williams, Spencer Williams) – 4:14
 "Sunday" (Chester Conn, Benny Krueger, Ned Miller, Jule Styne) – 4:41
 "Dinah" (Harry Akst, Sam M. Lewis, Joe Young) – 4:20
 "'Deed I Do" (Fred Rose, Walter Hirsch) – 4:47
 "Pee Wee Russell's Unique Sound" (Traditional) – 4:46
 "You Took Advantage of Me" (Richard Rodgers, Lorenz Hart) – 5:56
 "Rose Room" (Art Hickman, Harry Williams) – 7:02

Personnel
Buck Clayton – trumpet
Vic Dickenson – trombone
Pee Wee Russell – clarinet
Bud Freeman – tenor saxophone
George Wein – piano
Champ Jones – bass
Jake Hanna – drums

References

1960 live albums
Buck Clayton live albums
Vic Dickenson albums
Pee Wee Russell live albums
Bud Freeman albums
George Wein albums
Atlantic Records live albums